Doug Jung is an American screenwriter and film producer. He is known for writing the screenplay for the 2016 film Star Trek Beyond.

Filmography

References

External links
 

Living people
American film producers
American male screenwriters
American people of Korean descent
Year of birth missing (living people)